Gary Lee Brown  (born June 25, 1971) is a former American football offensive tackle in the National Football League (NFL) for the Green Bay Packers. He played college football for the Georgia Tech Yellow Jackets. Brown was inducted into the Suffolk Sports Hall of Fame on Long Island in the Football Category with the Class of 2015.

Professional career

Pittsburgh Steelers 
The Pittsburgh Steelers drafted Brown in the fifth round (148th overall) of the 1994 NFL Draft. He was cut by the Steelers during final cuts in 1994.

Green Bay Packers 
Brown debuted with the Green Bay Packers and played three seasons with them from 1994–1996. During his 3-year professional career he played in 25 games, starting 5 of his 8 games (including the first four) for the Super Bowl XXXI Champion Packers in 1996, although he was inactive for the Super Bowl. He was almost suspended for substance abuse after a 1995 DUI but was only fined.

References

1971 births
Living people
American football offensive tackles
People from Amityville, New York
Players of American football from New York (state)
Georgia Tech Yellow Jackets football players
Green Bay Packers players
Barcelona Dragons players
Brentwood High School (Brentwood, New York) alumni